
Year 748 (DCCXLVIII) was a leap year starting on Monday (link will display the full calendar) of the Julian calendar. The denomination 748 for this year has been used since the early medieval period, when the Anno Domini calendar era became the prevalent method in Europe for naming years.

Events 
 By place 

 Europe 
 January 18 – Duke Odilo of Bavaria dies after a 12-year reign. Grifo, youngest son of Charles Martel, seeks to establish his own rule by seizing the duchy for himself, and abducts Odilo's infant son Tassilo III.
In Rome, Pope Zachary closes down a slave market, where Venetian merchants had been selling Christian captives to the Muslims in North Africa.

 Britain 
 King Æthelbert II of Kent sends a message to Boniface, archbishop of Mainz, requesting two well-trained goshawks for hunting. He had earlier made a gift of two falcons and a goshawk to King Æthelbald of Mercia (approximate date).

 Arabian Empire 
 February 14 – Abbasid Revolution: The Hashimi rebels under Abu Muslim Khorasani take Merv, capital of the Umayyad province Khorasan (modern Iran), marking the consolidation of the Abbasid revolt. Qahtaba ibn Shabib al-Ta'i takes the cities Nishapur and Rey, defeating an Umayyad army (10,000 men) at Gorgan. 
 December 9 – Nasr ibn Sayyar, Arab governor of Khorasan, dies after a 10-year administration in which he has fought vigorously against dissident tribes, Turgesh neighbors, and the Abbasids. Nasr had imposed poll taxes (jizya) on non-Muslims, and introduced a system of land taxation for Muslim Arabs.
 The city of Baalbek (modern Lebanon) is sacked with great slaughter.

 Asia 
 An earthquake strikes the Middle East from northern Egypt to northwestern Mesopotamia, destroying many remnants of Byzantine culture (approximate date).

Births 
 Al-Waqidi, Muslim historian and biographer (approximate date)
 Charlemagne, king and emperor of the Franks (or 747)

Deaths 
 January 18 – Odilo, duke of Bavaria
 May 22 – Genshō, empress of Japan (b. 683)
 December 9 – Nasr ibn Sayyar, Arab general (b. 663)
 Cellan of Clonfert, Irish abbot
 Eadbert I, king of Kent (approximate date)
 Indrechtach mac Dungalaig, king of Brega (Ireland)
 Wasil ibn Ata, Muslim theologian and jurist (b. 700)

References